Aleksandr Akunichikov (born 16 August 1959 in Ural'sk, Kazakh SSR) is a Soviet sprint canoer who competed in the late 1980s. He won a gold medal in the K-4 10000 m event at the 1986 ICF Canoe Sprint World Championships in Montreal.

References

Living people
Kazakhstani male canoeists
Soviet male canoeists
1959 births
ICF Canoe Sprint World Championships medalists in kayak
People from Oral, Kazakhstan